Santo Brasca (1444/45 – after 1522) was an administrator and statesman in the Duchy of Milan under the Sforza. He went on a pilgrimage to the Holy Land in 1480 and wrote a detailed account of his travels, Vaggio del Santo Sepolcro. He  borrowed from the writings of an earlier pilgrim, Gabriele Capodilista, to augment his own account. He includes some practical advice for future pilgrims.

Notes

Bibliography

1440s births
1520s deaths
Duchy of Milan people
Holy Land travellers
Italian travel writers
15th-century travel writers